Brymon Airways is a British former airline with its head office in the Brymon House on the property of Plymouth City Airport in Plymouth, Devon. It was co-founded in 1972 by journalist Bill Bryce and racing driver Chris Amon.

History

The company was incorporated on 26 January 1970 as Brymon Aviation Limited operating as Brymon Airways.

Its name derived from its creator's surnames: Bryce and Amon. It quickly built up a network of routes from its bases at Plymouth and Newquay, to various UK airports (including the Channel Islands, the Isles of Scilly, London Heathrow and Gatwick) and some foreign destinations such as France.

In 1981, Brymon was the first UK airline to start using the de Havilland Canada Dash 7.  Four aircraft were acquired, two used in Aberdeen on contract for a consortium led by Chevron Oil and two flown from Plymouth, including the first ever scheduled service to Heathrow.

In June 1982, a Brymon Dash 7 flew into Heron Quays in the London Docklands, paving the way for London City Airport.  A further test flight took place the following year as part of a public enquiry.  Brymon was the lead airline in the quest for the airport and made the first ever landing in 1987.  Together with its partner Air France, Brymon introduced the airport's first services in November 1987.

Chris Amon was never involved in the day-to-day running of the airline and Bill Bryce resigned towards the end of 1984. British Airways acquired a large minority shareholding in the company and appointed Charles Stuart as chief executive and the then Sir Colin Marshall as chairman.

In October 1992, Brymon Airways merged with Birmingham European Airways to form Brymon European Airways. This was bought jointly by British Airways and Maersk Air, in 1993. British Airways acquired Brymon Airways, whilst Maersk Air bought the Birmingham European Airways section. Maersk Air renamed Birmingham European Airways to Maersk Air UK, but British Airways allowed Brymon to keep its name. Having said this, Brymon's Aircraft were repainted in British Airways Express colours. Around this time they initiated a service from Newcastle to Paris.

On 30 July 1993 the company was renamed Brymon Airways Limited to reflect the operating name.

In 1991 Brymon expanded even further, establishing a hub at Bristol, with services to Paris, Cork, The Channel Islands, Edinburgh, Glasgow, Plymouth, and a service to Newcastle and Aberdeen. Further expansion occurred in 1998, when it took over British Airways Regional services from Aberdeen to Birmingham and Manchester. They also introduced routes from Manchester to Edinburgh and Glasgow.

In 1999 routes were introduced from Newcastle to Belfast and Copenhagen, and from Aberdeen to Oslo.

On 28 March 2002 the airline was merged with British Regional Airlines and was renamed British Airways Citiexpress Limited operating as British Airways Citiexpress. British Airways Citiexpress pioneered and attained CAA Approval for the self-service boarding pass enabling passengers to print their own boarding passes at home. On 1 February 2006 the airline was renamed BA Connect Limited operating as BA Connect, which was in turn sold to Flybe in 2007.

Fleet

Brymon Airways fleet consisted of the following aircraft throughout operations:

See also
 List of defunct airlines of the United Kingdom

References

External links
 

Defunct airlines of the United Kingdom
Airlines established in 1970
Airlines disestablished in 2007
British Airways